Gallium telluride may refer to:

 Gallium(II) telluride
 Gallium(III) telluride